The West Tipperary Senior Hurling Championship (known for sponsorship reasons as the Tipperary Co-Op West Tipperary Senior Hurling Championship) is an annual hurling competition organised by the West Tipperary Board of the Gaelic Athletic Association since 1930 for senior hurling teams in West Tipperary, Ireland.

The championship has always been played using a knock-out format.

The West Tipperary Championship was, until recent times, an integral part of the wider Tipperary Senior Hurling Championship. The winners and runners-up of the West Tipperary Championship joined their counterparts from the other three divisions to contest the county championship quarter-finals.

Four teams currently participate in the West Tipperary Championship. The title has been won at least once by 13 different teams. The all-time record-holders are Clonoulty-Rossmore, who have won a total of 20 titles.

Clonoulty-Rossmore are the title-holders after defeating Éire Óg Annacarty in the 2017, 2018, and 2019 championship finals.

The championship

Overview

Since there are currently only two senior clubs in the division Clonoulty-Rossmore and Éire Óg Annacarty automatically qualify for the final. That game is played as a single leg. If that game ends as a draw there is a period of extra time, followed by a second period of extra time should the teams remain deadlocked. If both sides are still level at the end of extra time a replay takes place and so on until a winner is found.

Participating teams

Roll of honour

Finals

Records

By decade

The most successful team of each decade, judged by number of West Tipperary Senior Hurling Championship titles, is as follows:

 1930s: 4 each for Clonoulty-Rossmore (1930-31-32-33) and Cashel King Cormacs (1934-36-37-39)
 1940s: 4 for Éire Óg Annacarty (1941-42-43-44)
 1950s: 8 for Knockavilla-Donaskeigh Kickhams (1950-52-53-54-55-56-58-59)
 1960s: 2 for Éire Óg Annacarty (1964-67)
 1970s: 5 for Seán Treacy's (1973-74-77-78-79)
 1980s: 4 for Cappawhite (1983-84-85-87)
 1990s: 5 for Cashel King Cormacs (1990-91-93-94-95)
 2000s: 4 for Clonoulty-Rossmore (2002-07-08-09)
 2010s: 7 for Clonoulty-Rossmore (2010-11-12-16-17-18-19)

Gaps

Longest gaps between successive championship titles:
 38 years: Clonoulty-Rossmore (1951-1989)
 37 years: Knockavilla-Donaskeigh Kickhams (1960-1997)
 27 years: Éire Óg Annacarty (1986-2013)
 21 years: Cappawhite (1962-1983)
 20 years: Éire Óg Annacarty (1944-1964)
 18 years: Clonoulty-Rossmore (1933-1951)
 17 years: Cashel King Cormacs (1948-1965)
 14 years: Éire Óg Annacarty (1967-1981)
 13 years: Cappawhite (1987-2000)

References

West Tipperary Senior Hurling Championship